Eiken may refer to:

Places

Norway
Eiken, Norway, a former municipality in the old Vest-Agder county
Eiken, Agder, a village in Hægebostad municipality in Agder county
Eiken Church, a church in Hægebostad municipality in Agder county

Switzerland
Eiken, Aargau, a municipality in the district of Laufenburg in the canton of Aargau

People with the given name
, Japanese equestrian

Other uses
Eiken (studio), an anime studio based in Tokyo, Japan
STEP Eiken, a Japanese examination on the English language
Eiken (manga), a manga/anime series
Eiken syndrome, a rare autosomal bone dysplasia
Eiken Chemical, a Japanese company headquartered in Tokyo

Japanese masculine given names